Pencil2D is a free and open-source 2D animation software for Windows, macOS and Unix-like operating systems. It is released under the GNU General Public License and uses the Qt framework. It is used for making cartoons using traditional techniques (tracing drawings, onion skinning etc), managing vector and bitmap drawings.

It allows saving the animations in its own native file format, as well exporting it as a sequence of images in PNG, JPEG, BMP or TIFF format, and also in a video file in AVI, MP4, WebM, GIF or APNG format.

History 
The original version of the software was called Pencil, created by Patrick Corrieri and Pascal Naidon in 2005, but was abandoned and discontinued in 2009.
The abandonment of the project led to the creation of numerous forks, several of which were eventually merged into that of Matthew Chang, resulting in the project now known as Pencil2D.

The project then continues on the pencil2D.org site. From spring 2019, changes are made to the organization of updates, with the deletion of the CR, and the implementation of regular updates whose version numbers are even with patches, and more occasionally, odd versions adding features. The goal is to quickly fix bugs as soon as they appear, rather than letting them accumulate, and to offer stability fixes more quickly. It started with version 0.6.4, released in May 2019. The developers are also setting up a project upload page in order to establish a library of tests for debugging and validity tests.

See also 
 List of 2D animation software

References 

2D animation software
Free software
Cross-platform software
Software that uses Qt
Free and open-source software

External links